Following is a list of senators of Nord, people who have represented the department of Nord in the Senate of France.

Third Republic

Senators for Nord under the French Third Republic were:

 Jules Maurice (1876)
 Louis de Hau de Staplande (1876–1877)
 Jules Brame (1876–1878)
 Octave-Joseph d'Hespel (1876–1879)
 Maximilien Mailliet (1876–1879)
 Jules Dutilleul (1879–1883)
 Casimir Fournier (1879–1887)
 Émile Massiet du Biest (1879–1888)
 Louis Faidherbe (1879–1888)
 Charles Merlin (1879–1895)
 Édouard Fiévet (1885–1888)
 Alfred Girard (1887–1910)
 Victor Cirier (1888–1890)
 Achille Scrépel (1888–1897)
 Géry Legrand (1888–1902)
 Léon Claeys (1888–1906)
 Maxime Lecomte (1891–1914)
 Jean-Baptiste Trystram (1892–1905)
 Théophile Depreux (1895–1906)
 Émile Dubois (1897–1905)
 Auguste Potié (1903–1939)
 Félix Chatteleyn (1904–1906)
 Jean-Baptiste Trystram (1905–1924)
 Paul Hayez (1905–1935)
 Évrard Éliez-Évrard (1906–1908)
 Henri Lozé (1906–1915)
 Paul Bersez (1906–1940)
 Henri Sculfort (1908–1914)
 Charles Debierre (1911–1932)
 Joseph Dehove (1914–1924)
 Gustave Dron (1914–1930)
 Jean Plichon (1920–1924)
 Léon Pasqual (1924–1927)
 Émile Davaine (1924–1933)
 Albert Mahieu (1924–1940)
 Daniel Vincent (1927–1940)
 Amaury de La Grange (1930–1940)
 Édouard Roussel (1932–1940)
 Louis Demesmay (1933–1940)
 Guillaume des Rotours (1935–1940)

Fourth Republic 

Senators for Nord under the French Fourth Republic were:

 Ernest Couteaux (1946–1947)
 Henri Liénard (1946–1948)
 Isabelle Claeys (1946–1949)
 Henri Martel (1946–1951)
 Pierre Delfortrie (1946–1952)
 Albert Denvers (1946–1956)
 Maurice Walker (1946–1959)
 Armand Coquart (1948)
 Pierre Delcourt (1948)
 Arthur Marchant (1948–1951)
 André Canivez (1948–1958)
 Jules Houcke (1948–1958)
 Charles Naveau (1948–1959)
 Adolphe Dutoit (1949–1959)
 Marcel Ulrici (1951–1952) and (1956–1959)
 Jean Vandaele (1951–1958)
 Arthur Ramette (1952–1956)
 Robert Liot (1952–1959)
 Marcel Bertrand (1956–1959)
 Octave Bajeux (1958–1959)
 Alfred Dehé (1958–1959)
 Émile Dubois (1958–1959)

Fifth Republic 
Senators for Nord under the French Fifth Republic were:

 Maurice Walker (1959)
 Marcel Bertrand (1959–1961)
 Eugène Motte (1959–1965)
 Jules Emaille (1959–1965)
 Charles Naveau (1959–1967)
 Adolphe Dutoit (1959–1967)
 Alfred Dehé (1959–1969)
 Émile Dubois (1959–1973)
 Robert Liot (1959–1974)
 Octave Bajeux (1959–1983)
 Marcel Darou (1961–1974)
 Pierre Carous (1965–1990)
 André Diligent (1965–1974) and (1983–2001)
 Marcel Guislain (1967–1974)
 Hector Viron (1967–1992)
 Roger Deblock (1969–1974)
 René Debesson (1973–1979)
 Victor Provo (1974–1977)
 Jean Desmarets (1974–1983)
 Jean Varlet (1974–1983)
 Claude Prouvoyeur (1983–1992)
 Gérard Ehlers (1974–1985)
 Maurice Schumann (1974–1998)
 Roland Grimaldi (1977–1992)
 Jacques Bialski (1979–1997)
 Jean-Paul Bataille (1983–1992) and (1998–1999)
 Arthur Moulin (1983–1992)
 Guy Allouche (1983–2001)
 Ivan Renar (1985–2011)
 Marie-Fanny Gournay (1990–1992)
 Alfred Foy (1992–2001)
 Pierre Mauroy (1992–2011)
 Paul Raoult (1992–2011)
 Pierre Lefebvre (1997–2001)
 Dinah Derycke (1997–2002)
 Jacques Donnay (1999–2001)
 Sylvie Desmarescaux (2001–2011)
 Jean-René Lecerf (2001–2015)
 Bernard Frimat (2002–2011)
 Michel Delebarre (2011–2017)
 Marie-Christine Blandin (2001–2017)
 Anne-Lise Dufour-Tonini (2017)
 Dominique Bailly (2011–2017 
 Michelle Demessine (1992–1997) and (2001–2017)
 Delphine Bataille (2011–2017)
 Jacques Legendre (1992–2017)
 Patrick Masclet  (2015–2017)
 Béatrice Descamps (2007–2010) and (2017)
 Alain Poyart (2017)
 Alex Türk (1992–2017)
 René Vandierendonck (2011–2017)

As of January 2018 the senators were:

References

Sources

 
Lists of members of the Senate (France) by department